Apiospora is a genus of  fungi which cause plant diseases.  It gives its name to the family Apiosporaceae, which contains a number of other genera.  This is historically a name for the teleomorph (sexual) life-cycle stage of the fungus; for some species the corresponding anamorph name is Arthrinium.

Species
As accepted by Species Fungorum;

Apiospora aberrans 
Apiospora acutiapica 
Apiospora aquatica 
Apiospora arundinis 
Apiospora aurea 
Apiospora balearica 
Apiospora bambusicola 
Apiospora biserialis 
Apiospora buddlejae 
Apiospora camarae 
Apiospora camelliae-sinensis 
Apiospora camptospora 
Apiospora chiangraiense 
Apiospora chilensis 
Apiospora chromolaenae 
Apiospora cordylines 
Apiospora curvispora 
Apiospora cyclobalanopsidis 
Apiospora descalsii 
Apiospora deschampsiae 
Apiospora dichotomanthi 
Apiospora esporlensis 
Apiospora euphorbiae 
Apiospora gaoyouensis 
Apiospora garethjonesii 
Apiospora gelatinosa 
Apiospora guiyangensis 
Apiospora guizhouensis 
Apiospora hispanica 
Apiospora hydei 
Apiospora hyphopodii 
Apiospora hysterina 
Apiospora iberica 
Apiospora imperatae 
Apiospora indica 
Apiospora intestini 
Apiospora italica 
Apiospora jatrophae 
Apiospora jiangxiensis 
Apiospora kogelbergensis 
Apiospora liliacearum 
Apiospora locuta-pollinis 
Apiospora longistroma 
Apiospora lonicerae 
Apiospora luzonensis 
Apiospora malaysiana 
Apiospora marii 
Apiospora mediterranea 
Apiospora minutispora 
Apiospora montagnei 
Apiospora mori 
Apiospora mukdahanensis 
Apiospora multiloculata 
Apiospora muroiana 
Apiospora myrtincola 
Apiospora mytilomorpha 
Apiospora neobambusae 
Apiospora neochinensis 
Apiospora neogarethjonesii 
Apiospora neosubglobosa 
Apiospora obovata 
Apiospora ovata 
Apiospora pachyspora 
Apiospora paraphaeosperma 
Apiospora petiolicola 
Apiospora phragmitis 
Apiospora phyllostachydicola 
Apiospora phyllostachydis 
Apiospora piptatheri 
Apiospora pseudoparenchymatica 
Apiospora pseudorasikravindrae 
Apiospora pseudosinensis 
Apiospora pseudospegazzinii 
Apiospora pterosperma 
Apiospora qinlingensis 
Apiospora rasikravindrae 
Apiospora rottboelliae 
Apiospora rubi-fruticosi 
Apiospora rubi-ulmifolii 
Apiospora sacchari 
Apiospora saccharicola 
Apiospora sasae 
Apiospora septata 
Apiospora serenensis 
Apiospora setariae 
Apiospora setostroma 
Apiospora shiraiana 
Apiospora siamicola 
Apiospora sichuanensis 
Apiospora sorghi 
Apiospora sphaerosperma 
Apiospora spinulosa 
Apiospora stipae 
Apiospora subglobosa 
Apiospora subrosea 
Apiospora thailandica 
Apiospora tropica 
Apiospora vietnamensis 
Apiospora xenocordella 
Apiospora yerbae 
Apiospora yunnana 

Former species;
 A. apiospora  = Apiospora montagnei, Apiosporaceae
 A. apiospora var. minor  = Apiospora montagnei, Apiosporaceae
 A. bambusae  = Apiospora hysterina, Apiosporaceae
 A. carbonacea  = Pteridiospora javanica, Dothideomycetes
 A. chondrospora  = Pseudomassaria chondrospora, Pseudomassariaceae
 A. controversa  = Stigmochora controversa, Phyllachoraceae
 A. coryphae  = Appendicospora coryphae, Apiosporaceae
 A. curvispora var. rottboelliae  = Apiospora rottboelliae, Apiosporaceae
 A. lloydii  = Phyllachora bromi, Phyllachoraceae
 A. melastomata  = Rehmiodothis osbeckiae, Phyllachoraceae
 A. oryzae  = Nigrospora oryzae, Sordariomycetes
 A. paulliniae  = Anisomyces nectrioides, Gnomoniaceae
 A. polypori  = Anisomeridium polypori, Monoblastiaceae
 A. rubi-fruticosi f. minuscula  = Apiospora rubi-fruticosi, Apiosporaceae
 A. sepincoliformis  = Pseudomassaria sepincoliformis, Pseudomassariaceae
 A. setosa  = Apiospora hysterina, Apiosporaceae
 A. sinensis  = Arthrinium sinense, Apiosporaceae
 A. striola var. minor  = Apiospora montagnei, Apiosporaceae
 A. tintinnabula  = Apiospora hysterina, Apiosporaceae
 A. urticae  = Apiosporella urticae, Apiosporaceae
 A. veneta  = Apiognomonia veneta, Gnomoniaceae

References

External links
Apiospora at Index Fungorum

Sordariomycetes genera
Amphisphaeriales